The Adventures of Ford Fairlane is a 1990 American action comedy mystery film directed by Renny Harlin and written by David Arnott, James Cappe, and Daniel Waters based on a story by Arnott and Cappe. The film stars comedian Andrew Dice Clay as the title character, Ford Fairlane, a "Rock n' Roll Detective", whose beat is the music industry in Los Angeles. True to his name, Ford drives a 1957 Ford Fairlane 500 Skyliner in the film.

The film's main character was created by writer Rex Weiner in a series of stories that were published as weekly serials in 1979–80 by the New York Rocker and the LA Weekly. The stories were published as a book by Rare Bird Books in July 2018.

DC Comics produced a prequel miniseries of the same name

The film was both a commercial and critical failure, being awarded the Golden Raspberry Award for Worst Picture, tying with Bo Derek's Ghosts Can't Do It. However, despite of its poor reviews, it has dedicated fans around the world, and is often regarded as a cult film. Also, Billy Idol's "Cradle of Love" from the soundtrack became one of his biggest hits on the Billboard Hot 100 (peaking at #2).

Plot
Ford Fairlane is seen sitting on a beach smoking as the film opens. A flashback initiates, showing a roaring crowd at a concert at Red Rocks Amphitheatre in Morrison, Colorado, given by fictional popular heavy metal band The Black Plague. Lead singer Bobby Black makes an eccentric entrance down a zip-line from Creation Rock onto the stage and begins performing. Shortly into one of the band's songs, Bobby Black starts gagging and collapses dead on stage.
 
After the lead singer of The Black Plague is murdered onstage, shock-jock Johnny Crunch, an old friend who came west with Fairlane, hires Ford to track down a mysterious teenage groupie named Zuzu Petals, who may have a connection to Black's death.

Soon after hiring Fairlane, Crunch is electrocuted on the air. The world's hippest detective soon finds himself trading insults with ruthless record executive Julian Grendel, a clueless cop and former disco star, Lt. Amos, a merciless hit man named Smiley and countless ex-girlfriends out for his blood. Aiding and abetting Fairlane is loyal assistant Jazz and a hip record producer at the head of a bizarre lineup of suspects, victims, beautiful women, and a koala as he finds himself hip-deep in the case of his life.

The MacGuffin of the film is three data CDs which, when read simultaneously, detail the illegal dealings of Julian Grendel, who was getting rich from bootlegging his record company's music and murdered Bobby Black when he found out Black had acquired the CDs with the incriminating evidence. Both of Fairlane's beloved possessions, his house and his car, are blown to bits, courtesy of Grendel.

The first disc was with Colleen Sutton, the second with Zuzu Petals, and the third disc was hidden under the star for Art Mooney on the Hollywood Walk of Fame.

It is later revealed that Grendel killed Bobby Black and Johnny Crunch, as he considered them both greedy and stupid because they wanted more money for their involvement in pirating CDs to sell to the highest bidder, making Grendel Records and the rest of the music industry corrupt. However, Fairlane kills Grendel by setting him on fire with a flammable alcoholic milkshake and a cigarette. Jazz leaves Fairlane, knowing how ungrateful he is for everything that has happened. Smiley shows up and plans to kill Ford, but not before revealing that he killed his young neighbor's [the Kid's] father. Ford distracts him and kills Smiley with a sleeve pistol. Jazz and Ford decide to reconcile, while the Kid decides to join their detective agency. Ford wins a million-dollar radio contest and buys a yacht. He sails away with Jazz, the Kid and the koala (now in a neck brace). They're all now one big happy family.

Cast

 Andrew Dice Clay as Ford Fairlane
 Wayne Newton as Julian Grendel
 Priscilla Presley as Colleen Sutton
 Lauren Holly as Jazz
 Brandon Call as The Kid
 Maddie Corman as Zuzu Petals
 David Patrick Kelly as Sam the Sleaze Bag
 Morris Day as Don Cleveland
 Robert Englund as Smiley
 Ed O'Neill as Lt. Amos
 Gilbert Gottfried as Johnny Crunch
 Vince Neil as Bobby Black
 William Shockley and M. Russell Zulke as Punk Gunslingers
 Steve White as Detective Benny
 Kari Wuhrer as Melodi
 Sheila E. as Club Singer
 Lala as Sorority Girl
 Delia Sheppard as Josie
 Diana Barrows as Sorority Girl
 Tone-Loc as Slam
 Kurt Loder as himself

Howard Stern was originally considered for the role of Johnny Crunch. Billy Idol was originally to play Vince Neil's role, and David Bowie was approached to play Newton's.

Soundtrack
Music being central to the plot of a film about a private detective who specializes in cases arising from the music industry, the soundtrack featured a diverse group of artists. The official soundtrack release featured:
 "Cradle of Love" — Billy Idol
 "Sea Cruise" — Dion
 "Funky Attitude" — Sheila E.
 "Glad to Be Alive" — Lisa Fischer, Teddy Pendergrass
 "Can't Get Enough" — Tone Loc
 "Rock 'N Roll Junkie" — Mötley Crüe
 "I Ain't Got You" — Andrew Dice Clay
 "Last Time in Paris" — Queensrÿche
 "Unbelievable" — Yello
 "Wind Cries Mary" — Richie Sambora

The film's soundtrack includes Idol's "Cradle of Love", which also appeared on Idol's 1990 album Charmed Life.

A number of the musicians featured on the soundtrack also appeared in the film itself, including Morris Day, Sheila E., and Tone Loc (as Slam the Rapper). The members of the fictional band Black Plague are played by professional musicians: Vince Neil, lead singer of Mötley Crüe; Ozzy Osbourne bassist Phil Soussan and drummer Randy Castillo; and Quiet Riot guitarist Carlos Cavazo. Richie Sambora's contribution to the soundtrack was a cover of the Jimi Hendrix song "Wind Cries Mary". Yello's "Unbelievable" samples dialogue from the film, although a phone number given as "1-800-Perfect" is changed to "1-800-Unbelievable". Not appearing on the soundtrack is "Booty Time", the song that Ed O'Neill's character performs during the film.

Yello is also credited with the film's "music score", and an early cut of their album Baby is used as the film's incidental soundtrack. Barry McIlheney in Q magazine was critical of the collection and only highlighted the Billy Idol contribution while giving the overall release 2 out 5 stars.

Release

Critical response
The film received generally negative reviews upon release. Review aggregator website Rotten Tomatoes reports an approval rating of 25% based on 32 reviews, with an average rating of 4.3/10. On Metacritic, the film has a 24 out of 100 rating based on 13 critics, indicating "generally unfavorable reviews". Audiences surveyed by CinemaScore gave the film a grade "B" on scale of A+ to F.

Roger Ebert gave the film 1 star out of a possible 4, and called the film "loud, ugly and mean-spirited" but he also suggested that Clay had the confidence and screen presence for a successful acting career if he could move beyond his shtick.

Box office
The film was not a financial success during its original theatrical release, making just over $21 million in the U.S. According to Clay, "They pulled my movie...in a week...I was a lightning rod for everything  [politically correct]".

Awards and nominations

See also

 List of American films of 1990
 Dice Rules

Notes

References

External links

 
 
 
 

 

1990 films
1990 action comedy films
1990s adventure films
1990s mystery films
20th Century Fox films
1990s English-language films
American action comedy films
American adventure comedy films
American mystery films
American detective films
Films about music and musicians
Films directed by Renny Harlin
Puppet films
Films produced by Joel Silver
Films set in Los Angeles
Films shot in California
Films shot in Los Angeles
Silver Pictures films
Films with screenplays by David Arnott
Golden Raspberry Award winning films
Films with screenplays by Daniel Waters (screenwriter)
1990s American films